Matthew Murray (born February 2, 1998) is a Canadian professional ice hockey goaltender for the Texas Stars of the American Hockey League (AHL), while under contract to the Dallas Stars of the National Hockey League (NHL). He previously played junior in the Alberta Junior Hockey League (AJHL) with the Spruce Grove Saints and the United States Hockey League (USHL) with the Fargo Force, as well as NCAA collegiate hockey with the UMass Minutemen.

Playing career
Murray began his junior career in his hometown of St. Albert, spending three seasons with the St. Albert Sabres of the Alberta Major Bantam Hockey League (AMBHL) and St. Albert Flyers of the Alberta Major Midget Hockey League (AMMHL). He then began in Junior A with the Spruce Grove Saints of the Alberta Junior Hockey League (AJHL), leading the team to an AJHL championship in 2015 and winning both the AJHL and CJHL Best Goaltender awards for 2015–16. Murray ultimately joined the Fargo Force of the United States Hockey League (USHL) for his final junior season.

After the conclusion of his time in juniors, Murray played five seasons of collegiate hockey with the University of Massachusetts Amherst. Murray, posting a career 2.23 goals against average and .916 save percentage, helped the Minutemen to three consecutive Hockey East championships in 2019, 2021, and 2022, with a national championship victory in 2021. In his final season with UMass, Murray was named to the Hockey East Third All-Star team. During this time, Murray gained a degree of notoriety for sharing his name with the then-Pittsburgh Penguins goaltender of the same name, attending the Penguins' rookie camp after his first year at UMass.

As an undrafted free agent, Murray signed an amateur tryout contract with the Texas Stars of the American Hockey League (AHL) after his final season at UMass, appearing in eight games across the regular season and playoffs. During the following offseason, Texas signed Murray to a full two-year contract.

On October 31, 2022, Murray was signed to a one-year entry-level contract by the Dallas Stars of the National Hockey League (NHL), Texas' major-league affiliate. Shortly afterwards, he was recalled to Dallas' main roster as the result of an injury to starting goaltender Jake Oettinger, with Murray serving as backup to Scott Wedgewood.

After further injuries to Wedgewood, Murray was again recalled to Dallas' roster on February 22, 2023; Murray then made his NHL debut on March 2, earning his first win and saving 19 of 21 shots faced in a 5–2 victory over the Chicago Blackhawks.

International play
Murray appeared for the Canada West team in four games at the 2015 World Junior A Challenge, posting a .911 save percentage and 2.75 goals against average en route to a gold medal.

Career statistics

Regular season and playoffs

International

Awards and honors

Notes

References

External links
 
 WJAC statistics from Hockey Canada

1998 births
Living people
Canadian ice hockey goaltenders
Dallas Stars players
Fargo Force players
Ice hockey people from Alberta
NCAA men's ice hockey national champions
Sportspeople from St. Albert, Alberta
Spruce Grove Saints players
Texas Stars players
UMass Minutemen ice hockey players
Undrafted National Hockey League players